This is a list of the many characters from the animated television series Johnny Test (including its revival).

Main characters

Johnny Test

Jonathan Xavier "Johnny" Test (voiced by James Arnold Taylor) is the main protagonist of the show, the brother of Susan and Mary and the youngest child of Hugh and Lila. Johnny is 11 years old and best friends with his dog, Dukey. He is a mischievous, egotistical, and unpredictable young boy who's often called the "kid with the flaming hair" due to having scarlet red highlights in his blonde hair. Johnny typically wears green cargo pants, a navy blue jacket over a black T-shirt with a trefoil symbol, a watch (he rarely uses), and black hi-tops. Johnny can live any kid's dream because of his genius sisters, only to find that some aren't worth living. He tends to be showing hyperactivity and laziness quickly. In the course of these escapades, he often messes with his sisters' inventions, causing trouble and mayhem for the town. Just as often, however, Johnny proves himself to be very clever, either by convincing his sisters to help him solve his created problems or by saving the day from whatever good happens to show up. Unfortunately, he always resorts to deceit (sometimes blackmail) to get what he wants, and he angrily bemoans when things don't work out to his liking. His catchphrase is: "Whoa, didn't see that coming" during an unexpected event. Despite being generally repulsed by girls, he has nurtured attraction towards his classmates Janet and Sissy, the latter out of hostile rivalry. As a procrastinator, he goes to great lengths to avoid any work, often using his sisters' inventions to do so, putting himself and others in danger as a result. He also has a superhero alter ego that he calls "Johnny X," whose superpowers include hurricane hands (speeding wind from his hands), shapeshifting, fire-powered transformation, teleportation, ESP, and "Power Poots." A running gag for this form is that his hurricane hands never work, either due to the target being immune to it or other factors.

Dukey
Dukeson Leonard "Dukey" Test (voiced by Louis Chirillo in Season 1–4, Trevor Devall in Season 5 onwards) is Johnny's anthropomorphic talking pet dog and best (and only real) friend. He often serves as the voice of reason of the family. The cause of Dukey's anthropomorphism is the result of one of Susan and Mary's inventions. Whenever Lila and Hugh (or other humans) aren't around, Dukey will behave human-like because Hugh banned them from DNA experiments. There have been a few "close calls" around the series, a running gag where Dukey accidentally speaks in their presence (usually Hugh), causing them to ask with Johnny, Susan, or Mary answer "no," and people immediately believe them. Dukey sometimes dresses as a human being in public, with most people addressing him by others as Johnny's "hairy friend" or "the kid with the rare hair disorder." Dukey can easily give into assisting Johnny in his manipulations with steak. His superhero name was "Super Pooch," but then changed to "Super Dukey." He has all the same power as Johnny X but usually crashes while flying. Like Johnny (with or without intention), he tends to destroy Susan and Mary's Inventions. His TinyMon name is "Mymuttdog," and he evolves into "Dukandra."

Susan and Mary Test
Susan and Mary Test (also known as The Test Twins) are Johnny's genius twin sisters and daughters of Hugh and Lila, who frequently use him as a lab rat for various inventions, most of which to impress their neighbor, Gil. Though they generally refuse to help Johnny in his antics, they generally end up doing so anyway due to Johnny blackmailing or manipulating them, or in exchange for Johnny allowing them to use him as a test subject. Their hard-headed demeanor makes them gullible, and they have been tricked by Johnny on various occasions. They have a habit of speaking in unison especially when reciting their catchphrase "We're such geniuses". Both twins wear traditional lab coats and harbor a deep love and obsession for the Tests' next-door neighbor, Gil, although their attempts to attract his attention always fail. Both girls attend school at the Porkbelly (formally Mega) Institution of Technology. 

 Susannah Laura "Susan" Test (voiced by Maryke Hendrikse) is the younger twin. A 13-year-old girl who's the sister of Mary and Johnny and the technical middle child of Hugh and Lila. Susan has navy blue (later cyan blue) eyes, wears a black skirt, knee-high socks, a pair of Mary Janes, and a light blue shirt depicting a star. She has straight red hair, is held with a yellow star-shaped clip, and wears square-shaped glasses. Susan tends to be more irritable and harsh than Mary is, which often leads to her downfall. In the episode "Johnnymon," she claims to lacks sympathy for anyone. Eugene/Bling-Bling expresses fond interest in Susan, much to her disinterest. When Bling-Bling pursues Susan, she tries to bribe Johnny into protecting her. Her Catchphrases are "too much?" and "got carried away."

 Marionette Louise "Mary" Test (voiced by Brittney Wilson in Seasons 1 & 5, Ashleigh Ball in Seasons 2–4 & 6, Emily Tennant in the revival series) the older twin. A 13-year-old girl who's the sister of Susan and Johnny; and the technical oldest child of Hugh and Lila. She has greenish-blue eyes and often wears baggy blue jeans and green sneakers with her trademark yellow moon shirt. She has curly red hair, is held with a light moon-shaped clip, and wears moon-shaped glasses. Mary is more friendly and warm-hearted than Susan. She believes less in science and more in science fiction, which somehow always proves to be correct, despite Susan's scorn. She is also more level-headed and conservative than Susan and speaks her mind much less often.

Secondary characters

Hugh Test
Hugh Test (voiced by Ian James Corlett): The stay-at-home father and husband of the test family. Throughout the series, he is portrayed as the disciplinarian of the Test household since, unlike his wife, he has shown to be the one who is more likely to scold and punish the Test kids (mainly his youngest son). He has blond hair, blue eyes and wears a green sweater over a yellow shirt with brown pants and loafers. Hugh is (apparently) naive because Dark Vegan can perform a mind trick on him, and they only work on dumb people. Hugh's two biggest obsessions are cleaning and cooking meatloaf, which the rest of the Test family openly despises. He also gets distracted if he loses his shoe, and can't focus on anything if he does, something that Johnny occasionally exploits. He often wants his children to come back before dinner at risk of being grounded. A running gag is that he will often ground them for a month for even the smallest offense or for ridiculous reasons. He has forced everyone (including his wife) or trick anyone to get his way; such as giving up all her phones due to vacationing reasons. He outlaws genetic experiments by Susan and Mary towards beings (although it's rarely mentioned); despite it being frequently defied.
Even with his obssesion for the rules, he loves his family. He sais that he put rules for the family’s security. He usually cooks strange meatloaff, but in one episode he demostrate that he can cook normal food and a good meatloaff, so the strange mixes are a hobby and not inability for cook.

Lila Test
Lila Test (née Little) (voiced by Kathleen Barr): The mother of Johnny, Susan, and Mary and wife of Hugh. She has brownish-reddish hair, green eyes (later cyan blue), and wears a typical women's work suit, pearl necklace, and heels. She is a businesswoman (though her profession has yet to be specified, she works in telemarketing). Due to the demands of her job and the fact she's a workaholic, Lila isn't seen at home as often as the rest of the family, but her family always comes first, and she never misses out on vacations and family events. Lila also possesses martial arts skills and is shown to be less strict than her husband, but sometimes forced against her will to take a break from work to relax. Lila has a scary/crazy side that even Hugh has shown fear when he makes mistakes in front of her. She is a dedicated perfectionist and will have a mental breakdown when pushed too far.

Gil Nexdor
Gil Nexdor (voiced by Andrew Francis) is a handsome 15-year-old boy and Susan and Mary's crush, who doesn't even know they exist, despite having lived next door to him since they were born and even having met them face to face on several occasions. He is continuously depicted as intellectually lacking, although his handsome looks compensate for this most of the time. Much to the great ire of Susan and Mary, Gil considers Johnny his friend (whenever Gil appears when Johnny is around, he shouts, "Hey, Johnny!"). Due to Susan and Mary's crush, many of their experiments often revolve around him, on some occasions even affecting him directly. However, he can never seem to remember their names save for occasions. His surname "Nexdor" is a pun on "next door," alluding to the fact that he is Johnny's next-door neighbor. In the first season, Gil was actually halfway competent and a bit intelligent.

Mr. Black and Mr. White
Mr. Black (voiced by Bill Mondy) and Mr. White (voiced by Scott McNeil in the original series, Deven Mack in the revival series) are secret Agents who ask the Tests (Johnny, Mary, Susan, and Dukey) for help whenever they cannot handle a crisis alone, which is most of the time. They seem to be highly incompetent and somewhat slackers at their job. They claim not to be afraid of anything and could shoot ropes from their wrists in their first appearance. Ironically, Mr. White is African American/Canadian, and Mr. Black is European American/Canadian (likely of Germanic ethnic origin). Despite first appearing as villains, they're now friends to the Test kids on most occasions. They also have a hidden passion for cooking. They also dream of a vacation in Fiji and say so in a singsong voice ("we are going to Fiji").

General
The General (voiced by Lee Tockar) is Mr. White and Black's boss and leader of the area 51.1 army base. Loud, slightly incompetent, and forgetful, he frequently takes action whenever the situation becomes too large for the Tests to maintain, although his efforts never fare any better (he even causes the situations sometimes). Even though he doesn't approve of the Test Family and their experiments, He still considers them an ally. He is prone to overkill and rarely considers what result his actions may have on civilians, to the point he fired at a forest, an inhabited area, and even an amusement park, all in an attempt to destroy a monster. He is also very prone to be a glory hog and gloater when he is successful. A running gag in the series involves him forgetting something and hesitating to remember and planning to get Susan and Mary an internship when they graduate.

Sissy Blakley
Elisabeth Olivia "Sissy" Blakley (voiced by Brittney Wilson in Seasons 1 & 5, Ashleigh Ball in Seasons 2–4 & 6) is a girl who tends to hide her crush on Johnny through bullying and asserting superiority over him. She is 11 (possibly 12) years old around the same age as Johnny. Johnny also has a crush on her, although he doesn't seem to be aware of it or denies it. The two are constantly competing against each other. If Sissy beats him, she will brag about it. Whenever Johnny wins, he'll either get caught into a situation or brag as much as her. Although seen as his equal (if not better than him), Johnny often cheats most episodes. In "Saturday Night's Alright for Johnny,"  when Johnny pretends to be nice to her, their feelings are shown (along with Dukey and Missy). She seems to be the victim of the show's twists, adventures, and random outcomes; her misfortune often happens at the end of the episode. In later seasons, they become more friendly to each other, and Sissy becomes more aware of her crush on Johnny (admitting to thinking he was cute in the 100th episode). She has blonde hair with a red lightning bolt pattern, multiple ear piercings, and a plaid skirt with pants underneath.

Bumper Randalls
Mitchell "Bumper" Randalls (voiced by Scott McNeil) is a local bully who regularly tortures the kids at Porkbelly Jr. High, especially Johnny; he tortures Johnny more than anyone else. However, he has a sensitive side as he loves roses and even has a rose garden. He has two cats: a white cat called "Cuddles" and an orange tomcat. He also has a lizard named Mr. Muncher and a dog. Some episodes imply his father wants him to be a wrestler, but he only wants to grow flowers, so he takes his anger out on Johnny, leading to him bullying all the time. In "Johnny X Strikes Back," he gains the power to turn to stone and flight.

Henry Teacherman
Mr. Henry Joseph Teacherman (voiced by Louis Chirillo in Seasons 1–4, Trevor Devall in Seasons 5 onwards) is Johnny's school teacher, who Johnny believes "has it in for him" (which he sometimes does). He seems to think that his students don't try hard enough and has been shown to like it when a student fails a test (rarely giving assignments on topics they never learn). At times, Mr. Teacherman has even conveyed to get sadistic pleasure out of punishing Johnny. Mr. Teacherman is always very tough, but not always to be mean. He believes that deep down, there is a great student inside of everyone....including Johnny. It's shown that even Johnny can't reason, trick, or bribe him out of a challenging assignment/decision showing that he can be super stubborn and strict.

Recurring characters

Janet Nelson, Jr.
Janet Nelson, Jr. (voiced by Kathleen Barr) is Johnny's former crush. Janet was a self-centered popular girl, that was usually mean and inconsiderate to him, appointing him as a loser. She had a love–hate relationship with him, but she is too popular to express the love part. Janet was a regular recurring character early in the first season, but by the second half, Sissy Blakely took over as Johnny's main love interest leading Janet to become a secondary love interest/rare point of interest. She would continue to make cameos throughout the second and third seasons but by season 4, Janet is no longer seen or referred to again. Janet had long black hair parted in the middle with pink barrettes on the side, and wore a pink shirt, white pants and purple shoes.

Hank Anchorman
Hank Anchorman (voiced by James Arnold Taylor) is an anchorman for Porkbelly News. In his first appearance, he had blond hair, was thinner and younger, but later on, he had brown hair (which was a wig), was older, and had a different face. He often reports about the Test family. He is highly devoted to his job to the point he will risk his well-being for a report/update on a story. He is also capable of breaking the fourth wall on certain occasions.

Mayor Howard
Mayor Howard (voiced by Lee Tockar) the Mayor of Porkbelly. He is a short bald man who still lives with his mother. He easily panics at the first sign of trouble and will not hesitate to cave in to pressure. Whenever a supervillain appears, he would always agree to swear allegiance with the villain and change the city's name before the villain even says anything. He is an unreliable mayor due to his lack of reasonability, spending on the town, and his constant need for help at even the most simple solvable problems. At one point, he exhausted Johnny (as Johnny X) and Dukey (as Super Pooch) due to his constant calling for help, resulting in them "retire" their superhero identities for a while.

Principal Franklin Goode
Principal Franklin Goode (voiced by James Arnold Taylor) is the principal of Johnny's middle school who likes Johnny, despite his antics, which have caused large-scale destruction on more than one occasion. He always cuts Johnny some slack (like giving him extra credit to avoid summer school, making Johnny Hall monitor, etc.) and even denies Henry Teacherman's constant pleas of punishment for Johnny. However, there is always a catch....if he does bail him out, Johnny must fulfill his end of the deal or he'll reverse the decision (which he rarely does because he always gives Johnny another chance). There are times when Johnny and Henry have gotten on his bad side, leading him to have no choice but to punish them much to their dismay.

Lunch Lady
The Lunch Lady (voiced by Kathleen Barr) at Porkbelly Middle School who has greenish skin and speaks in a German accent. She can be very cruel when students don't eat her disgusting (albeit sometimes healthy) food. She even becomes a nemesis to Johnny in an episode where she tries to destroy him for giving kids applesauce. She is very stubborn and will go to great lengths to make sure her food is eaten. She can also be a critic; she criticized and even laughed at Johnny's cause for applesauce even though she aggressively pushed her food onto the students and angrily denied anyone who requested anything else other than her food.

Professor Slopsink
Professor Slopsink (voiced by Richard Newman) is the German head professor at the Mega (later Porkbelly) Institute of Technology (M.I.T., later P.I.T). He is also Bling-Bling, the Test twins, and Tim Burnout's Teacher. Due to a mishap with one of Eugene's (Bling-Bling Boy) theses, he lacks a left hand, so now he uses a robotic hand (though Repto-slicer ate that as well). He sometimes mistakenly doubts or underestimates his students' potential; which results in him being proven wrong, which he responds by giving them a high grade.

Mrs. Hamilton
Mrs. Hamilton (voiced by Lee Tockar) is the mother of Bling-Bling Boy and Mr. Hamilton's Wife. She is very harsh with her son and is always screaming, but is calmed by smooth talk.

Tim Burnout
Timothy "Tim" Burnout (voiced by Louis Chirillo in Seasons 1-4, Trevor Devall in Seasons 5-6) is a classmate of Susan and Mary and the former owner of Mr. Mittens. He copied the modified genetic structure used by Susan and Mary to create Dukey and used it on Mr. Mittens which turned him into an evil villain seeking world domination. Despite his lazy personality, he is apparently very intelligent, as he was able to alter Mr. Mittens (despite stealing the idea). His last name refers to the way he acts.

Lolo
Lolo (voiced by Ashleigh Ball) is Susan and Mary's midnight blue lab monkey on who they sometimes test their experiments. She loves bananas and is somewhat intelligent (possibly due to the sister's tests). She has a strange metal hat piece on her head for an unexplained reason.

Missy
Missy Blakley (voiced by Ashleigh Ball in Seasons 2 onwards; Brittney Wilson in Season 5) is Sissy's pink labradoodle dog, who seems to show the same amount of dislike to Dukey as Sissy does to Johnny. Dukey has a crush on her but often displays the same hatred Johnny does for Sissy.

Repto-Slicer
Repto-Slicer (vocal effects provided by Andrew Francis) is a blue-green mutant lizard. He earned his name from his ability to have razors protrude from his entire body; he even has a chainsaw for a tongue. Repto-Slicer excels at salsa-making. He was originally owned and created by Eugene, who managed him very poorly. Repto-Slicer later decided to stay with Johnny after he tamed him.

Jillian Vegan
Jillian Vegan (voiced by Maryke Hendrikse) is Dark Vegan's daughter.  She disapproves of her father's evil ways and makes friends with Johnny by helping him save his world twice. As of the fourth season, Jillian lives comfortably on Earth, having integrated successfully into its culture. She is a humanoid with green hair.

Mrs. Vegan
Mrs. Vegan (voiced by Ashleigh Ball) is Dark Vegan's wife and Jillian's mother, who constantly nags about Vegan's plans to take over the world.

The Turbo Toy Force
The Turbo Toy Force is A group of toys that were animated and given superpowers by Johnny, Dukey, Mary, and Susan to battle Nasteria. The group consists of Stacy, Nice Sweatered Ben, a toy bunny rabbit, a toy dragon, a chew toy, and formerly Mega Roboticle.

Speed McCool
Speed McCool (voiced by Lee Tockar) is a famous actor. In the movies he is in, he has a chimpanzee. Johnny is a fan of his and once used a virtual reality machine to get inside his films.

Montague
Montague (voiced by Lee Tockar) is an anarchist talking mouse bent on world domination. He is a wild card but will succumb to cheese. He appears in two episodes: in Johnny's Big Dumb Sisters, he makes brief cameos, but in Tom and Johnny, he has a more significant role, eventually helping out the Test siblings and Dukey. He becomes an antagonist in one episode where he tries to live in Johnny's house.

Dog Catcher
The Dog Catcher (voiced by James Arnold Taylor) is the owner of Porkbelly's Animal Control. His first appearance was in the episode "Here Johnny, Here Boy!" He captured Johnny, Susan, and Mary after using the Animal Machine, which turned them into animals (Johnny into a dog and Susan and Mary into lions). He made minor appearances such as "Johnny's 100th Episode" where we see that Johnny first adopted Dukey.

Fillmore
Fillmore (voiced by Lee Tockar) is a clerk in the video game store "Game Galaxy." He made his first appearance in the episode "Phat Johnny." Johnny once made teased of him because he's fat (although Fillmore claims he has a glandular problem).

Villains

Bling Bling Boy
Eugene "Bling-Bling Boy" Hamilton (voiced by Lee Tockar) is a prominent antagonist and friendly enemy of Johnny and Dukey, preferring to be called "Bling-Bling Boy" (because of his gold jewelry and watches). However, most characters usually address him by his real name, which annoys him greatly. He is a multi-millionaire with unlimited funds at his disposal. He is also somewhat powerful amongst the characters despite having fears of being punished by his mother. He has a big crush on Susan, who doesn't reciprocate his feelings, and often resorts to evil plots or blackmail to win her affection, which always fails/backfires, usually courtesy of Johnny. He occasionally teams up with Johnny and Dukey to defeat the other villains when the situation demands it. Similar to Susan and Mary, he often tricks Johnny into testing some of his inventions. Deep down: Bling-Bling Boy is insecure due to being obese and having buck teeth, although in "Phat Johnny," his weight and buck teeth help him become successful as a hip hop star. He also attended the Mega Institution of Technology, but was kicked out after his thesis ate Professor Slopsink's hand. He later was allowed to return to the Institute in exchange for aiding in preventing a nuclear crisis. In "Johnny X Strikes Back," he gains the power of gold vision and flight.

Miss X and Miss Z
Miss X and Miss Z (voiced by Brittney Wilson in Season 1, Maryke Hendrikse in Season 2) are two cyborgs created by Bling-Bling Boy to work at their disposal. They can operate and have a mind of their own when Bling-Bling is not around or in need. They have high intelligence, capable of studying at the Institute Of Porkbelly, and avoid attention. Throughout the seasons, they are more robotic and shown to have more than one pair of them. They only appeared in the first two seasons of the show.

Mr. Whack-O
Mr. Whack-O (voiced by Colin Murdock) is one of the first major villains of Johnny Test. Despite being a toymaker, he deeply loathes kids and makes incredibly destructive toys to rid the world of them. He seems quite intelligent and quite wealthy despite the bad publicity he brings to his company. Mr. Whack-O would come up with plans to get rid of kids which often annoys his employees who constantly remain loyal to him. He is the leader of the Johnny Stopping Evil Force 5 where he formed its first incarnation with Brain Freezer, Beekeeper, Mr. Mittens, and his butler Albert with King Zizrar being part of the second incarnation when Beekeeper turns good. Mr. Whack-O is obsessed with destroying Johnny and the Tests at almost every chance he gets, due to Johnny foiling his plans in the past, making him go mentally insane. Heis so obsessed with Johnny, he'll carelessly risk his own safety or other people just to gain an advantage over The Tests. Mr. Whack-O is later revealed to have a twin brother named the Tickler.

He is somewhat similar to Toyman in "Superman." His name is a spoof of Wham-o, a real-life toy company, and Whacko, fittingly, means "a crazy person."

Brain Freezer
Brain Freezer (voiced by Louis Chirillo in seasons 1–4, Bill Mondy in seasons 5 & 6) is the former janitor and coffee guy of P.I.T. He is a self-proclaimed genius with his inventions typically involving both coffee and ice. He has a "Chillachino Machine" that can freeze anything including creating armor made of ice. It appears that Brain Freezer is immune to the blasts from his freeze gun as he uses them to transform into his supervillain form by blasting himself but his 'Chillachino' will still freeze him solid if he drinks it. He often makes ice-related puns. In one episode, the reason for Brain Freezer's villainy is that he's just lonely and that girls constantly reject him (which he responds with insanity/madness and hatred); leading his character to be a sympathetic villain.

He is a parody of Mr. Freeze from Batman & Robin.

The Beekeeper
The Beekeeper (voiced by James Arnold Taylor) is a man in a beekeeper's suit that can control bees. His secret identity is Doc Beebles, maker of Piles 'O Honey Bars. His debut plot was to use his bees to eat all other candy in the world so his Piles 'O Honey Bars would finally sell (nobody bought his bars because they were naturally sweet and healthy), though he really wanted the kids to be healthier. After his first defeat, Beekeeper joined the Johnny Stopping Evil Force 5. He does later help out the Test siblings and Dukey saves a candy holiday that they created. Due to this, he is currently reformed and likes the Tests leading him to be replaced by King Zizrar on the Johnny Stopping Evil Force 5. Beekeeper loves saying "bee" as "be" as a pun when he's wearing his beekeeper suit.

Mr. Mittens
Mr. Mittens (voiced by James Arnold Taylor) is an evil cat with the same modified genetic structure as Dukey by Susan and Mary's classmate Tim Burnout who owned Mr. Mittens. It was mentioned that Tim was a terrible owner to Mr. Mittens due to the fact that Tim never cleans out his litter box. He very commonly tries to turn the entire world into cats in his evil plans like he did in his first appearance or he plans to have revenge on Johnny and Dukey. In one episode, he claims to want revenge on Johnny when in reality, he's just lonely like Brain Freezer. Like Dukey, he is highly intelligent but seems to lack Dukey's fighting skills and luck. He also loves to cheat in competitions which usually backfires with instant karma. A running gag of his is that he coughs up hairballs at specific moments.

Albert
Albert (voiced by Lee Tockar) is Mr. Mittens' aforementioned butler who used to serve Mr. Mittens' owner Tim Burnout. Albert isn't seen hating Johnny, but he was forced into the squad because he has to take care of Mr. Mittens all the time (it is debated if he's a villain or he's just doing his job). He is quite calm and down to earth. He has shown that he can't be tickled, even by the best machines (in fact, he broke and overloaded a machine in the process of being tickled) at the time when Johnny Test faced off against Mr. Whack-O's twin brother the Tickler. He has also shown to have matching intelligence as his master. A running gag is that when Mr. Mittens coughs up hairballs at specific moments, Albert would clean it up. He is an obvious parody of Alfred Pennyworth.

King Zizrar
King Zizrar (voiced by Scott McNeil) is the ruler of the mole people who, on a few occasions, attempted to take over the world or invade the surface, only to fail due to his intense aversion to light. He's charismatic and a good tactician, but can be a pushover at times and a coward when the odds don't work in his favor. He is the first villain Johnny ever fought, though is among the least-recurring villains. After the Beekeeper reformed from the Johnny-Stopping Evil Force Five, Zizrar took his place. For unknown reasons, Zizrar was very small and short in season 1, being about half Johnny's size. However, in later seasons, he became much bigger and taller, being roughly the same height as Johnny.

Dark Vegan
Dark Vegan (voiced by James Arnold Taylor) is the ruler of Vegandon, a seemingly utopian planet composed completely of the Vegans, humanoids who at first appear peaceful and well-meaning, but in reality, they go to other planets and sap them of their resources, which is what he tried to do to Earth on two occasions and nearly succeeded. After his second attack on Earth, he and his family were left stranded on Earth, much to the ire of Vegan and the pleasure of his family. Although Johnny eventually helped him to return to Vegandon, he later returned to Earth and became a regular resident after discovering his planet was incapable of producing his new favorite food: toast. He has a mind-control power that works only on dumb people. He is Jillian's father and is very overprotective of her (he threatens the earth/Johnny with destruction if his daughter isn't satisfied or if it doesn't meet his standards). Later in the series, He appears as a wildcard of The Tests (he constantly changes from ally to enemy, especially to Johnny). He is a parody of Darth Vader from the Star Wars movies and Dark Helmet from the 1987 film Spaceballs.

Minor villains
The following are minor villains that Johnny went up against:

 The Caveman: Appeared in the episode "Stinkin Johnny", the Caveman is a towering caveman-themed wrestler. Johnny wants to enter a wrestling competition so that he can win a new HDTV. Before wrestling, Susan and Mary make a costume for Johnny which allows him to spray gas out of his costume. Before the competition, Johnny sprays gas at Bumper, the evil dogs, and his dad. When Johnny was about to spray The Caveman with his costume, he realized that he ran out of perfume and gets chased by The Caveman. Later, Johnny gets kidnapped by the Caveman, and Dukey, Susan, and Mary try to rescue Johnny but they get kicked out. Johnny's dad shows up but he gets thrown out as well. When Johnny was about to be beaten up by the Caveman, his mom appears to save him. After Lila beats the Caveman, she saves Johnny and wins $10,000. In the end, Johnny and Dukey both get grounded from TV, and Susan and Mary both get grounded from the lab.

 Blast Ketchup (voiced by Kathleen Barr): The main character of the Tiny'Mon games, Blast Ketchup has dreams of becoming the World's Greatest Tiny'Mon Master. Ever since Johnny was trapped in their world and Blast was defeated by Johnny, it became his goal to defeat Johnny in Tiny'Mon to become the Tiny'Mon champion he self-proclaims deserves. It is easy for him to detect tricks and is not under using dirty tactics to win such as kidnapping. He always takes the first words of what people say, mistaking them as Tiny'Mon. He is a parody of Ash Ketchum from the Pokémon series.
  Ed: Blast Ketchup's friend and cheerleader. He's always considered everyone as a loser, despite showing a lack of social skills and experience in Tiny'Mon.
 Screechereen: Evolved from the almost completely weak Cuddlebuns. She is a legendary Tiny'mon that many believed didn't exist and is incredibly strong. In Return of Johnny'mon, she is brought up as female. She resembles Lugia from the Pokémon series.
 Cuddlebuns: A cute but weak Tiny'mon. In fact, it is the weakest Tiny'mon ever. In Johnny'mon, it is revealed that it can evolve into Screechereen.
 Baboomerang and Badias: Blast Ketchup's Tiny'Mons. Baboomerang (formerly Kadoomerang) is listed with 1000 Power Point's, while Badias has 1100. Baboomerang appeared as an anthropomorphic baboon. He wore armor, a belt, and a diaper. Badias appeared like Screechereen but in black.

 Claire Nefarius (voiced by Kathleen Barr): A character who appeared in the episode "The Quantum of Johnny". She is the daughter of Larius Nefarius. In the episode, she had a birthday party and hid to launch missiles into her father's factory (which was nearby) to get her dad to spend more time with her. Johnny constantly mentions that she is hot. At the end of the episode, Larius Nefarius learned of his mistake and promised to spend more time with her and act like a father. He started by forbidding her from dating Johnny because she is too young.

 Warty (voiced by James Arnold Taylor): Johnny's talking wart who appeared in the episode "Johnny's Got a Wart!". He started as a regular wart until he was brought to life. Although Johnny was unsure how he obtained a wart on his left wrist. Worried, Dukey took him to the Lab, hoping Susan and Mary get rid of it. They shot it with a "laser", though it failed. Later at school, the wart came to life and became helpful to Johnny: he helped him remember his locker combination, got him an "A" in math, confronted Bumper by revealing his inner soft side, and got Johnny an invite to a party with cheerleaders. After school, Warty grew eyes that Johnny thought was creepy. Warty became evil and took over Johnny's body (by controlling his brain and nerves) and then the world though was stalled since he struggled to control Johnny and couldn't do so until he had complete control of Johnny's brain.

 The Tickler (voiced by Colin Murdock): The Tickler is Mr. Whack-O's twin brother. He has red hair and mechanical arms that he uses to tickle people who threaten him into submission. At one point, Johnny thought he was Mr. Whack-O until the Tickler corrected him. Unlike his brother, he was more evil and serious and was able to weaken Johnny's chances of defeating him by kidnapping Susan and Mary and taking their weapons so Johnny and Dukey couldn't fight back. However, they succeeded in defeating the Tickler after receiving help from Zizrar (who advises them to use the element of surprise), Dark Vegan (who lends Johnny and Dukey helmets to deepen their voices so they sound more intimidating), Mr. Mittens (who tells Johnny to use amusing and well-fitting catchphrases), and Albert (who is the only one who is not ticklish).

Other characters
  Extreme Teen Team: Appeared in the episode "Johnny Test: Extreme Crime Stopper". In that episode, they stole all the drinks and snacks at a store at night without paying. At the end of the episode, they were caught and sent to jail. They also made minor appearances throughout the series.

 Super Smarty Pants: A pair of pants that allow the user to gain higher intellectual abilities. It first appeared in the episode "Johnny's Super Smarty Pants". It has artificial intelligence and surprisingly, strong obsessive emotions for Johnny. It also has a strong hate for Dukey and The Smarty Pants will harm Dukey every chance it gets. It reappeared in "The Return of Johnny Super Smarty Pants" all the way from Antarctica to get back Johnny and take control of his brain.

 Construction Drones: Robots created by Susan and Mary are used to aid them in building their inventions. Johnny, however, uses them whenever he can to his advantage. They can build everything that they were commanded to do. From tables, benches, and pancakes, to giant and advanced tree houses or houses referencing a horror show. They have the ability to turn their hands to brushes and tools and transform their feet to wheels. They're intelligent, fast, and handy. but they do have some weaknesses, such as working so fast and hard makes them get short-circuited.

 Jeffy (voiced by Ashleigh Ball): A character first appearing in "Johnny's No. 1 Fan." He claims to be Johnny's Number 1 fan. At first, he was nice to Johnny but took things too far. He becomes Dark Vegan's Number 1 Fan at the end of the episode. Jeffy returns in the second season of the revival in "Johnny Con," where he impersonates Johnny's alter ego "Johnny X."

 Mega Roboticle: Johnny's red hero robot action figure that he used Susan and Mary's 'Static Animator' to bring to life. Mega Roboticle is the former leader of The Turbo Toy Force.

 Moon Fiends (also called Moonsies): The idiotic and evil blue aliens that live on the moon who made their first and only appearance in the episode "Johnny Gets Mooned". A bunch of evil Moon Fiends attacked Johnny and Dukey in outer space when they came to the moon to research Johnny's paper. The army of Moon Fiends ate a lot of spice cheese nachos, which gave them stink gas and fart on Johnny and Dukey. The leader sent all moon fiends, and later mega fiends, to attack the duo, only for Johnny to use the knowledge from his report (and the report itself) to defeat them all and escape.

 Road Burn: A white and yellow monster truck built by Bling-Bling Boy, he has a golden chassis, diamond rims, and diamond lights; he uses it to impress Susan. But she wasn't interested in it, Bling-Bling Boy then kicks it for not winning Susan's heart, Road Burn suddenly becomes alive and knocks Bling-Bling Boy away. After seeing a poster of a monster truck rally, he follows Johnny And Dukey to the Porkbelly stadium. He is more powerful than any normal monster truck, he can crush monster trucks, withstand flame throwers and missiles, and can even push back monster trucks. He can breathe fire out of his mouth and chomp through vehicles. Road Burn later reforms and lets his son go play with Johnny and Dukey. He only appeared in the episode "Johnny And The Attack Of The Monster Truck".

 Boyborgs: Robotic machines designed to look like Gil Nexdor, built by Susan and Mary Test. They are the main antagonists of "Johnny vs. Super Soaking Cyborgs" after they learn that the Twins love Gil more than them and attempt to eliminate him.

 Ms. Blakely: A minor character who appeared in the episode "Johnnyitis". She is Sissy Blakely's mother.

 Mrs. Majekowski (voiced by Kathleen Barr): A minor character who appeared in the episode "No Homework for Johnny". She is an elderly cat lady. The Homework Buddy steals the cookies she makes, which questions Johnny where it gets them from. Additionally, there is a similarly named character in another Scott Fellows created show, Big Time Rush.

 Branson Ridgeway (voiced by Lee Tockar): A minor character who first appeared in the episode "Johnny's Trophy Case". He was the creator of the Bike Jump Stunt contest. He made another appearance in "Johnny Rich".

 Larius Nefarius (voiced by James Arnold Taylor): A character who appeared in the episode "The Quantum of Johnny". He was first thought to be a villain but near the end of the episode, it is discovered that his daughter Claire was the real villain. Since he spends most of his time working, he barely has time for her. He is a parody of Ernst Stavro Blofeld, a James Bond supervillain, as they both hold and cuddle a cat while they are planning something nefarious.

 Mrs. Crabapple (voiced by Maryke Hendrikse): A character who first appeared in the episode "Who's Johnny". She teaches the "special classes". Students who appear in her class, like Bumper, are called "Bad Apples". She made another appearance in "Johnny Susan Susan Johnny".

 King Fufassel (voiced by Bill Mondy): A character who appeared in the episode "Princess Johnny". He is the ruler of Schmuldavia. He was at war with Muldavia's Princess Maribel over corn dog production rights, but Johnny managed to end the war when he pretended to be Princess Maribel and forced him to have a treaty/truce.

 Princess Maribel (voiced by Ashleigh Ball): A character who appeared in the episode "Princess Johnny". She looks very identical to Johnny; except she is a girl,(which ironically Johnny finds unattractive) lacks Johnny's hair highlights and wears a dress. She is the princess of Muldavia. It was at war with Schmuldavia led by King Fufassel. She goes missing and Johnny is recruited by Black & White to masquerade as her until she is found. She's eventually found in the hotel's arcade, dressed like Johnny. Johnny empathizes with her and after finding her after she ran away, threatened her guardian to give her more leisure time.

 Hotel Manager: An unnamed hotel manager who first appeared in the episode "Johnny Test in 3D". He does not allow pets in the hotel. He can smell wherever an animal, such as a dog, is in the hotel. This has led to him stalking Johnny when he snuck Dukey into the hotel. When the hotel manager does catch Johnny and Dukey in their room by the time the rest of the Tests arrived, Lila got him to back off by threatening to move her conference to another hotel. He made several cameo appearances in later episodes.

 Tyler (voiced by Kathleen Barr): An overweight boy who enjoys eating his boogers. He made his first appearance in "Johnny Mint Chip". He used to be gross and immature (as seen in the episode "Johnny's New BFF") but then became a teenager. He made several cameo appearances throughout the rest of the series.

 Wendell (voiced by Ashleigh Ball): An boy who enjoys insects. He made his first and only appearance in the episode "Johnny's New BFF". 

 Dawg & Bone (voiced by James Arnold Taylor and Louis Chirillo respectively): The two characters that came from the TV in Johnny's house, with Susan and Mary's invention. Dawg & Bone try to destroy Johnny and Porkbelly since they think they are zombies. Since they live in a cartoon world in a cartoon, their cartoon rules are stronger than Johnny and Dukey's, they also can give punishment as much they can take. Johhny and Dukey claim to dislike this show, despite having strong similarities to the show's main characters. In fact, Johnny and Dukey broke the Fourth Wall a few times realizing how similar they are but can't put their finger on how or not realizing the similarities.

 High-Pitched Hal (voiced by Andrew Francis): A character who appeared in the episode "Johnny Tube". He is a popular star on Snoobtube (a parody of YouTube) and received a movie deal in Hollywood.

 Truant Officer (voiced by James Arnold Taylor): An unnamed truant officer who appeared in "Johnny Test's Day Off". Johnny decides to ditch his school after a rough week until he sees the officer driving by. Johnny and Dukey hid in Lila's car until they were at P.I.T. Susan & Mary come outside and tell Johnny that they don't want to help him, but the truant officer catches up and puts Susan and Mary into the back of his truck in an attempt to take them to Johnny's school since he doesn't think that they should be in college but Johnny distracts him and Dukey helps them out. The officer chases the 4 throughout the city.

 Kirk Kirkland (voiced by Scott McNeil): A character who appeared in the episode "Johnny Boat Racing". Kirk and his team are national champions in boat racing. They challenged Johnny, Dukey, and their friends in a boat race after Johnny questioning why their rowing when nowadays we have motorboats.

 Willy Keller (voiced by James Arnold Taylor): A minor character who appeared in the episode "Johnny Daddy Day". He used to be Hugh's best friend when he was 10 years old until they hated each other after Hugh stole Willy's girlfriend in high school. Johnny and his sisters learned that the hard way. He made another cameo appearance in "Black & White & Johnny All Over"

 Xeandra (voiced by Maryke Hendrikse): A character who appeared in the episode "Fangs A Lot Johnny". She is a movie star who appears in a vampire movie in the Porkbelly Movie Theater. Gil Nextor is a huge fan of her. She is a caricature of Kristen Stewart who portrays the fictional character Bella Swan in the Twilight novel series.

 Joni West (voiced by Kathleen Barr): The female counterpart of Johnny Test. She made her first appearance in "Johnny Alternative" along with her best friend and female counterpart of Dukey, Dutchy. She and Dutchy teamed up with Johnny and Dukey to get rid of the counterparts of Albert and Mr. Mittens. In the episode, she seemed to like or have a crush on Johnny. Her first thought was disgusting, then, later on, he ended saving her from being turned into a kitten, she was touched and they almost ended up kissing but Johnny went back to his world. She made another appearance in the web series, starting with the episode "The League of Johnnys".

 Dutchy (voiced by Maryke Hendrikse): The female counterpart of Dukey. She made her first appearance in "Johnny Alternative". She's the pet and the best friend of Joni and has the same personality as Dukey. She has a brief crush on Dukey.

 Simon and Mark West (voiced by Ian James Corlett and Trevor Devall respectively): The male counterparts of Susan and Mary Test. They made their first appearances on the episode "Johnny Alternative" when Johnny Test and Dukey were sucked into a portal that sent them into Simon and Mark's world. Simon and Mark's parents might look the same as Susan and Mary's parents because there is a picture in their house that looks exactly like Lila Test.

 Betty Crumper (voiced by Brittney Wilson): A minor character that appears in "Johnny Alternative". She is the female counterpart of Bumper.

 Eugenia "Glam-Glam Girl" (voiced by Lee Tockar): The female counterpart of Bling-Bling Boy who makes her only appearance in the episode "Johnny Alternative". She has a huge crush on Simon, just like the way Bling-Bling Boy has a crush on Susan Test.

 Phobious McPhobe (voiced by Trevor Devall): A character appearing in "Johnny Germ Fighter". McPhobe is a famous Hygienist and a scientist who loves to get rid of germs at any time (he even made bathroom cleaning foams) and wishes to make the world a cleaner place. Hugh once (when he was a kid in a camp) got a badge from him for being a clean and careful scout (Hugh explained that after that nobody has ever seen him) but it appeared that he quit his job when he sneezed once while he was cleaning the bathroom when he was younger. (McPhobe said that his cleanness got under doubt and he decided to never get back to his work again) after that he built a foam-making laboratory, becoming an alone scientist. He first refused to help Johnny and Dukey about getting rid of the germs (telling that he doesn't do this anymore) but finally decided to help them by making an ingredient that can kill the germs but after Johnny accidentally poured down an "attracting ingredient", it made the germs attack the lab, forcing McPhobe, Johnny and Dukey to escape from the lab and McPhobe destroy the lab with all of the germs in it. After that, with Hugh's suggestion, he lived with the Test family until his lab was rebuilt.

 Monty Butterworth (voiced by Ian James Corlett): A spoiled rich kid and a mutual enemy of Bling-Bling Boy and Johnny who was first seen in "Mush, Johnny, Mush".

 Clyde (voiced by Scott McNeil): Susan and Mary's pet orangutan. He first appeared in "Johnny and Clyde". Since he's an orangutan, he copies everything that people do on TV which causes a lot of trouble for Johnny and Dukey when he learned how to rob banks from watching TV (which is why Susan and Mary told Johnny NOT to let him watch TV).

References

 Lists of characters in American television animation
 Lists of characters in Canadian television animation
 Johnny Test